The World Wheelchair Curling Championship is an annual world championship held to determine the world's best team in wheelchair curling. It is held every non-Paralympic year.

Medalists
Following is a list of medalists:

All-time medal table
As of 2023 World Wheelchair Curling Championship

Performance timeline

World Wheelchair-B Curling Championship
The World Wheelchair-B Curling Championship is a qualifier event for the World Wheelchair Championship. From 2015 to 2018, the top 2 teams qualify for the World Championship. Starting at the 2018 World Wheelchair-B Curling Championship, the top 3 teams qualify.

Medallists
Following is a list of medallists for the World Wheelchair-B Championship:

References

 
Wheelchair curling
Wheelchair
Recurring sporting events established in 2002